Last Day of the Dinosaurs is a 2010 Discovery Channel television documentary about the extinction of the dinosaurs. It portrays the Alvarez hypothesis as the cause of extinction. The documentary was released on August 28, 2010 and narrated by Bill Mondy.

Production of the film 
The dinosaur models created for Clash of the Dinosaurs were reused for this program. The Parasaurolophus model was used for Charonosaurus even though the legs of Charonosaurus were shorter than those of Parasaurolophus. The Deinonychus model was used for Saurornithoides (rather inaccurately, as Saurornithoides was slenderer than Deinonychus), and the Sauroposeidon model was used for Alamosaurus (even though Alamosaurus had different proportions than Sauroposeidon). The same Tyrannosaurus rex, Triceratops, Ankylosaurus, and Quetzalcoatlus models were also used. These models were placed upon different backdrops most of the time than those used in Clash of the Dinosaurs.

Plot summary 
In the Pacific Northwest,      a   Quetzalcoatlus   is soaring above the valley during a rain    storm when it spots an unguarded Tyrannosaurus  nest. The   pterosaur then  flies down    and consumes several  young babies. Meanwhile,       the     father Tyrannosaurus is hunting for prey in the forest when his acute sense of smell alerts him to the intruder     and runs back to  the nest. The T. rex repeatedly lunges and tries to kill it. It finally takes off just as the father  bites   its   foot,      though the pterosaur manages to break free of his jaws by pecking at his eye and then flying away. Only one   hatchling     survives  the attack.

A male Triceratops loses a fight for mating rights against another male Triceratops.      Two T.rex hear the commotion and close in to attack the loser.          Working together,     they bring down the Triceratops and eat it together.

Meanwhile, in   Mexico,     a herd of Alamosaurus  are   roaming the plains in search of food. A female lays a clutch of eggs   as an   asteroid  enters the     atmosphere.    The asteroid hits the Earth in   Mexico,            causing   a   big   explosion and sending debris shooting through the air.        The     explosion heats the air temperature near the  site to hundreds of degrees.       Hundreds of Alamosaurus are burned alive.      Moments later,         burning debris  come raining down from the sky,      crushing many Alamosaurus.     Afterwards,   a magnitude 11 earthquake  cripples the rest of the herd before  the blast wave   arrives and finishes off the last of the Alamosaurus.     Most of the   eggs are destroyed but some survive, buried under the  soil.  

In what is now Mongolia, a herd of Charonosaurus reside by a watering hole, where the females lay their eggs. A Saurornithoides steals an egg from one of the nests, but is soon confronted by the enraged mother. A second Sauronithoides appears however, which forces the Charonosaurus to flee. The two predators chase their prey and eventually manage to bring her down.

The impact has caused a searing hot ejecta cloud to begin engulfing the planet. As it approaches the pacific northwest, the earthquake from Mexico arrives  and begins to decimate the area. The debris burn holes in the Quetzalcoatlus wings, and the male's wings eventually lose their ability to keep him in the air, and he falls to his death, his mate eventually having to land to avoid the same fate. The pair of Triceratops make it up into the mountains, only to be engulfed by the ejecta cloud, which scorches them alive. 

The intense heat from the ejecta cloud ignites fires around the world, including in the pacific northwest. This causes a firestorm to form that reaches speeds of 9mph. All large dinosaurs, including a feeding Tyrannosaurus, a group of Triceratops and an Ankylosaurus are forced to flee whilst smaller animals hide underground. The female Quetzalcoatlus, who was mourning her mate, is also forced to fly away as the firestorm consumes the forest.

In Mongolia,     forty-five minutes since the impact, the ejecta cloud rolls in from the east, increasing the temperature around Mongolia by several degrees every second until it reaches 300°,      causing three Charonosaurus and a pair of Saurornithoides  to use  the   cave for shelter. The third stays  close. However, the dramatic shift in temperature causes a gargantuan sandstorm. The Saurornithoides survive by hiding behind their prey, while the third Charonosaurus remains in the cave. The two other Charonosaurus however get caught in the storm and quickly suffocate. The storm eventually passes, and the last Charonosaurus heads to the watering hole on her own, with the  surviving Saurornithoides making their way there too, where they find the Charonosaurus taking a drink. They are desperately hungry, yet  they   are too weak from their ordeal. One of them recklessly attacks the Charonosaurus, but after a quick struggle, the hadrosaur collapses on top of it,     killing it. The remaining Saurornithoides resorts to cannibalising  the corpse of its companion.

Four days since impact, food is in short supply across the entire planet.        In the Pacific Northwest, four Triceratops head towards an island untouched by  a   fire  storm in search of food. The cause  of  the island    forms a   huge megatsunami, but also causes the water to recede and form a  bridge to the ocean.         Three of the Triceratops cross the land bridge to the island.      The   remaining female  Quetzalcoatlus lands, where  she   eats a stranded fish,    just as the   wave   builds and races towards   shore.     She  attempts to take off but is caught into  a  big   wave     and drowns, with the wave  drowning     three Triceratops as well.

Ten days have passed since impact,  only   a   few dinosaurs remain.        In Mongolia,      the Charonosaurus stays close to the   hole,       but collapses and dies from inhaling gas  that rose  up    from the   hole.       The      Saurornithoides runs up to the dead Charonosaurus,     but it too is killed by the toxic   gas.

Back  in the Pacific Northwest,    a small number of dinosaurs  patrol the  grey    wasteland.       A     starving   Ankylosaurus finds a small bush,   and almost faces off with a  Triceratops,       until a Tyrannosaurus arrives.      The Tyrannosaurus loses an  eye to his prey's right horn,     but he then manages to break off its left horn and kills it by lunging and biting down on its neck.              The Tyrannosaurus then turns his attention to the Ankylosaurus and after being struck in the  leg,  flips it onto its back and bites its throat.           He  then    heads back to the dead Triceratops,           but trips over the Ankylosaurus and  has his neck  impaled  on    the Triceratops's  remaining right horn.    In  the end,   an Alamosaurus baby emerges from an egg that was sheltered away in the ground. But a new time beginning, the time of the mammals.

List of Animal  species

Dinosaurs 
 Alamosaurus
 Ankylosaurus
 Charonosaurus 
 Saurornithoides
 Triceratops
 Tyrannosaurus

Pterosaurs 
 Quetzalcoatlus

Mammals 
 Mesodma

Athropods 
 Cockroach
 Scorpion

Awards
The film was a Gemini Award nominee for Best Science or Nature Documentary at the 26th Gemini Awards.

References

External links
 Last Day of the Dinosaurs at Discovery.com
 Last Day of The Dinosaurs from Imdb
 Last Day of The Dinosaurs from Documentary Mania

Documentary films about dinosaurs
2010 television films
2010 films
Documentary films about earthquakes
Documentary films about tsunamis
Documentary films about extinctions
Films set in British Columbia
Films set in Mexico
Films set in Mongolia
Discovery Channel original programming
American documentary television films
Canadian documentary television films
2010s American films
2010s Canadian films